was a warship of the Imperial Japanese Navy during World War I and World War II.  Designed by British naval engineer George Thurston, she was the third launched of the four s. Laid down in 1912 at the Mitsubishi Shipyards in Nagasaki, Kirishima was formally commissioned in 1915 on the same day as her sister ship, . Kirishima patrolled on occasion off the Chinese coast during World War I, and helped with rescue efforts following the 1923 Great Kantō earthquake.

Starting in 1927, Kirishimas first reconstruction rebuilt her as a battleship, strengthening her armor and improving her speed. From 1934, a second reconstruction completely rebuilt her superstructure, upgraded her engine plant, and equipped her with launch catapults for floatplanes. Now fast enough to accompany Japan's growing carrier fleet, she was reclassified as a fast battleship. During the Second Sino-Japanese War, Kirishima acted primarily as a support vessel and troop transport, moving army troops to mainland China. On the eve of World War II, she sailed as part of Vice-Admiral Chuichi Nagumo's Kido Butai as an escort for the six carriers that attacked Pearl Harbor on 7 December 1941.

As part of the Third Battleship Division, Kirishima participated in many of the Imperial Japanese Navy's early actions in 1942, providing support for the invasion of the Dutch East Indies (now Indonesia) and in the Indian Ocean raid of April 1942. During the Battle of Midway, she provided escort to Nagumo's four carriers, before redeploying to the Solomon Islands during the Battle of Guadalcanal. She escorted Japanese carrier fleets during the battles of the Eastern Solomons and Santa Cruz Islands, before sailing as part of a bombardment force under Admiral Nobutake Kondō during the Naval Battle of Guadalcanal.

On the evening of 13 November 1942, Kirishima engaged American cruisers and destroyers alongside her sister ship . On the night of 14/15 November, in one of only two battleship duels of the Pacific War, Kirishima attacked and damaged the American battleship  before being fatally crippled in turn by the battleship  under the command of then Captain Glenn B. Davis. Kirishima capsized and sank in the early morning on 15 November 1942 in Ironbottom Sound.

Design and construction

Kirishima was the third of the Imperial Japanese Navy's s, a group of capital ships designed by the British naval engineer George Thurston. The four battlecruisers of the Kongō class were designed to match the naval capabilities of the other major powers at the time; they have been called the battlecruiser version of the British (formerly Turkish) battleship . With their heavy armament and armor protection (which took up 23.3% of their approximately 30,000 ton displacement), Kirishima and her sister ships were vastly superior to any other Japanese capital ship afloat at the time.

The keel of Kirishima was laid down at the Nagasaki shipyards of Mitsubishi Heavy Industries on 17 March 1912, with most of the parts used in her construction manufactured in Japan. Due to a shortage of available slipways, Kirishima and her sister ship  were the first two capital ships of the Imperial Japanese Navy to be built in private Japanese shipyards.  After her launch on 1 December 1913, Kirishimas fitting-out began later that month.  On 15 December 1914, Captain Kamaya Rokuro was assigned as her chief equipping officer, and she was completed on 19 April 1915.

Armament
Kirishimas main battery consisted of eight  heavy-caliber main guns in four twin turrets (two forward, two aft). The turrets were noted by the US Office of Naval Intelligence to be "similar to the British 15-inch turrets", with improvements made in flash-tightness. The ship's magazines could accommodate ninety rounds of ammunition for each of the main guns, which had an approximate barrel life of 250–280 shots. In 1941, dyes were introduced for the armor-piercing shells of the four Kongō-class battleships, with Kirishimas shells using blue dye.

Her secondary battery was originally sixteen  50-caliber medium guns in single casemates (all located amidships), eight  anti-aircraft guns, and eight submerged  torpedo tubes. The sixteen 6-inch/50 caliber guns were capable of firing 5–6 rounds per minute, with a barrel life of 500 rounds. The 6-inch/50 caliber gun was capable of firing both antiaircraft and antiship shells, though the positioning of the guns on Kirishima made antiaircraft firing impractical. During her second reconstruction, the 3-inch guns were removed and replaced with eight  guns. These guns could fire between 8 and 14 rounds per minute, with a barrel life of 800–1500 rounds. Designed to fire antiaircraft, antiship, and illumination shells, the 5-inch/40 caliber had the widest variety of shot type of Kirishimas guns. During her second reconstruction, Kirishima was also fitted with a small number of  Type 96 antiaircraft autocannons.

Service

1914–1927: Battlecruiser

After seven months of trials, she was reassigned to the 3rd Battleship Division of the Second Fleet, with Captain Shima Takeshi in overall command of the ship. In April 1916, Kirishima and Haruna departed Sasebo Naval Base to patrol the East China Sea for ten days. Her last patrol operation of World War I was off the Chinese and Korean coast in April 1918. In July 1918, Kirishima acted as the transport of Prince Arthur of Connaught for his extended cruise to Canada, before returning to Japan.

Following the end of World War I, the Japanese Empire gained control of former German possessions in the central Pacific per the terms of the Treaty of Versailles. Due to Japan's warm relations with the British Empire and the United States at the time, Kirishima and other Japanese warships became significantly less active than during the war. On 1 December 1920, she was reassigned to the Third Division of the Second Fleet. On 10 September 1922, she collided with the destroyer  during fleet maneuvers, with both ships sustaining minor damage. Following the Great Kantō earthquake of September 1923, the capital ships of the Imperial Japanese Navy assisted in rescue work until the end of the month. She was placed in reserve in December 1923.

With the conclusion of World War I and the signing of the Washington Naval Treaty, the size of the Imperial Japanese Navy was significantly lessened, with a ratio of 5:5:3 required between the capital ships of the United Kingdom, the United States, and Japan. The treaty also banned Japan from building any new capital ships until 1931, with no capital ship permitted to exceed 35,000 tons. Provided that new additions did not exceed 3,000 tons, existing capital ships were permitted to be upgraded with improved torpedo bulges and deck armor.

1927–1934: Battleship

Stripped of the ability to construct new capital ships, the Imperial Japanese Navy instead opted to significantly upgrade and reconfigure their existing battleships and battlecruisers. Kirishima was placed in Third Reserve in December 1926, before beginning her first reconstruction in early 1927. Horizontal armor over the ammunition magazines was strengthened, and she was also fitted with anti-torpedo bulges, as permitted by the Washington Treaty. To upgrade Kirishimas speed, the 36 coal-fired Yarrow boilers were removed and replaced with ten new mixed-firing Kampon boilers. To allow for more equipment to be installed on board, her forward superstructure was reconstructed in the Pagoda mast style, facilitating the removal of one of her three funnels. The reconstruction of the Kongō-class battlecruisers added an additional 4,000 tons of armor to the ships, directly violating the terms of the Washington Treaty. On 16 April 1930, the reconstruction was declared complete.

Six days after Kirishimas reconstruction was completed, Japan pledged to scrap several  battleships and signed the London Naval Treaty, which placed further bans on capital ship construction until 1937. From August to October 1930, she was outfitted with the equipment necessary to equip reconnaissance seaplanes. Kirishima patrolled the coast of China near Shanghai in April 1932, before she was again placed in the Third Reserve.

In September 1931, Japan invaded Manchuria. On 25 February 1933, based on a report by the Lytton Commission, the League of Nations agreed that Japan had violated Chinese sovereignty in its invasion of Manchuria. Refusing to accept the organization's judgment, Japan withdrew from the League of Nations the same day.  Immediately following, Japan also withdrew from the Washington and London Naval Treaties, thus removing all restrictions on the number and size of her capital ships.

1934–1941: Fast battleship

On 18 November 1934, Kirishima was drydocked in Sasebo Naval Arsenal in preparation for her second reconstruction, which would enable her to function alongside Japan's growing fleet of fast carriers. Her boilers were removed and replaced with eight new oil-fired Kampon Boilers, and she received newer geared turbines. The elevation of her main and secondary battery was increased, and she was equipped with two Nakajima E8N "Dave" and Kawanishi E7K "Alf" reconnaissance floatplanes. To this end, aircraft catapults and launch-rails were also refitted. Her older 3-inch guns were removed and replaced with eight 5-inch dual-purpose guns. She was also outfitted with twenty Type 96 25 mm antiaircraft guns in twin turrets, while two of her 6-inch guns and her remaining torpedo tubes were removed.

Kirishimas armor was also extensively upgraded. Her main belt was strengthened to a uniform thickness of 8 inches (as opposed to varying thicknesses of 6–8 inches before the upgrades), while diagonal bulkheads of a depth ranging from  reinforced the main armored belt. The armor around her ammunition magazines was also strengthened over the course of the refit. The reconstruction was declared complete on 8 June 1936.

In August 1936, Kirishima departed Sasebo alongside  to patrol the Chinese coast off Amoy. From March 1937 to April 1939, she was frequently deployed as a support vessel and troop transport during the Second Sino-Japanese War. In November 1938, Kirishima was designated the command vessel of the Third Battleship Division, and was under the command of Rear Admiral Chuichi Nagumo. In November 1939, she was placed in reserve and fitted with additional armor on the front faces of her turrets and barbettes.

On 11 November 1941, after a series of transfers between Japanese naval bases, Kirishima was outfitted in preparation for coming hostilities and assigned—alongside her sister ships—to the Third Battleship Division. On 26 November, Kirishima departed Hitokappu Bay, Kurile Islands in the company of Hiei and six Japanese fast carriers of the First Air Fleet Striking Force (and ). On 7 December 1941, aircraft from these six carriers attacked the United States Pacific Fleet at their home base of Pearl Harbor, sinking four U.S. Navy battleships and numerous other vessels. Following the attack and the declaration of war by the United States, Kirishima returned to Japan.

1942: Combat and loss

On 8 January 1942, Kirishima departed Japan for Truk Naval Base in the Caroline Islands alongside the Carrier Strike Force. She provided escort during the invasion of New Britain on 17 January before returning to Truk. She sortied again in response to American carrier raids in the Marshall and Gilbert Islands. In March 1942, while supporting fleet operations off of Java in the Dutch East Indies, one of Kirishimas floatplanes bombed an enemy merchant vessel. South of Java, the Japanese fleet was surprised by the appearance of the destroyer . Hiei and  initially opened fire on the ship but failed to score any hits. After dive-bombers from three of Admiral Nagumo's carriers immobilized the destroyer, Kirishima and the other two ships resumed firing on Edsall until she sank.

In April 1942, Kirishima and the Third Battleship division joined five fleet carriers and two cruisers in an attack against British naval bases in the Indian Ocean. On 5 April—Easter Sunday—the Japanese fleet attacked the harbor at Colombo in Ceylon, while seaplanes from the  spotted two fleeing British cruisers, both of which were later sunk by aerial attack. A floatplane from Kirishima also strafed a withdrawing oil tanker. On 8 April, Japanese carrier aircraft attacked the Royal Navy base at Trincomalee in Ceylon, only to find that all of Admiral James Somerville's remaining warships had withdrawn the previous night. Returning from the attack, a floatplane from Kirishimas sister ship Haruna spotted the aircraft carrier  and escorting destroyer , which were quickly sunk by a massive aerial attack. Upon returning to Japan, Kirishima was drydocked and her secondary armament configuration modified with the addition of 25 mm antiaircraft guns in twin mounts.

In June 1942, Kirishima sailed as part of the Carrier Strike Force during the Battle of Midway, providing escort for Admiral Nagumo's four fast carriers alongside Haruna. Following the disastrous battle, during which all four Japanese aircraft carriers were destroyed, she took on survivors from the carriers before returning to Japan. In August 1942, she departed Japan for the Solomon Islands in the company of Hiei, three carriers, three cruisers and eleven destroyers, in response to the American invasion of Guadalcanal. She escorted Japanese carriers during the Battle of the Eastern Solomons, during which the light carrier  was sunk. Following the battle, the fleet returned to Truk Naval Base. During the Battle of the Santa Cruz Islands, Kirishima was part of Rear Admiral Hiroaki Abe's Vanguard Force, which provided distant cover to Nagumo's carrier groups. She was attacked by American dive-bombers on 26 October, yet remained undamaged.

On 10 November 1942, Kirishima departed Truk alongside Hiei and eleven destroyers in preparation to shell American positions on Guadalcanal in advance of a major transport convoy of Japanese troops. U.S. Navy reconnaissance aircraft spotted the Japanese fleet several days in advance, and a U. S. Navy force of two heavy cruisers, three light cruisers and eight destroyers was deployed under the command of Rear Admiral Daniel J. Callaghan in Ironbottom Sound to meet them. At 01:24 on 13 November, the Japanese force was detected  out by the light cruiser . In the ensuing First Naval Battle of Guadalcanal, the American task force concentrated the majority of their firepower on the battleship Hiei. This enabled Kirishima to score multiple hits on the Helena and heavy cruiser . Both Hiei and Kirishima then raked San Francisco with shellfire, killing Rear Admiral Callaghan. However, Hiei was in turn crippled by San Francisco and several American destroyers. With Hiei effectively out of the battle, Kirishima and the surviving destroyers withdrew to the north. On the morning of 13 November, she was ordered to tow Hiei to safety. However, the heavily damaged battleship came under air attack, and was eventually abandoned and scuttled.

On the evening of 13 November, Kirishima and her escorting destroyers were joined by the Fourth Cruiser Division and prepared to reenter Savo Sound, the Solomon Islands - "Ironbottom Sound" under the command of Admiral Nobutake Kondō. In the early morning of 14 November, three Japanese heavy cruisers bombarded Guadalcanal before withdrawing. The two fleets made contact on 14 November at 23:01. They exchanged gunfire and torpedoes, with four American destroyers disabled (three would later sink), while the destroyer  was crippled by Washington and South Dakota.

Kirishima and the heavy cruiser  illuminated South Dakota with searchlights, and almost all of Kondō's force opened fire on her. Kirishima achieved hits on South Dakota with at least three 14-inch salvos, which failed to penetrate her armor, and several salvos from her secondary battery, which knocked out the battleship's fire control systems and communications. At 23:40, South Dakota suffered a series of electrical failures, crippling her radar, radios and gun batteries.

Kirishima was hit by at least twenty primary and seventeen secondary battery projectiles, penetrating the magazines for her forward 14-inch turrets (the magazines were flooded before they detonated), destroying the hydraulic pumps which jammed her rear 14-inch turrets and steering, setting her superstructure afire, and causing flooding that led to an 18 degree list to starboard. Initially, the light cruiser  attempted to tow her out of Ironbottom Sound. When it became clear she could not be salvaged, the surviving Japanese destroyers evacuated Captain Iwabuchi and the remaining survivors. Kirishima capsized and sank at 03:25 on the morning of 15 November 1942, with 212 crewmen lost.

Wreck

Kirishimas wreck was discovered by Robert Ballard during an expedition to map the wrecks from the Battle of Guadalcanal in 1992. She lies upside down, with her bow section missing from the bridge forward due to a magazine explosion. Her anchor chain is wrapped around her stern section.
Ballard's investigation of the wreck unfortunately was aborted due to a technical emergency, resulting in the dive only lasting some nine minutes.
This severely limited any information or images obtained.
A further expedition to the wreck by Paul Allen's  in January 2019 provided detailed information on both the damage received during the battle and confirms the subsequent detonation of her forward main magazines during the sinking process.

Notes

Footnotes

Citations

References

 
 
 
 
 
 Jackson, Robert (2000).  The World's Great Battleships.  Brown Books.  
 Jackson, Robert (editor) (2008). 101 Great Warships. London. Amber Books. 
 
 
 
 
 McCurtie, Francis (1989) [1945]. Jane's Fighting Ships of World War II. London: Bracken Books. 
 
 
 Stille, Cdr Mark (2008). Imperial Japanese Navy Battleship 1941–1945. Oxford: Osprey Publishing. 
 
 Willmott, H.P. & Keegan, John [1999] (2002). The Second World War in the Far East. Smithsonian Books.

External links
 
 Construction of Kirishima

Kongō-class battlecruisers
Ships built by Mitsubishi Heavy Industries
1913 ships
Second Sino-Japanese War naval ships of Japan
World War II battleships of Japan
Shipwrecks in Ironbottom Sound
Maritime incidents in November 1942
1992 archaeological discoveries